Walter Edward Slater (January 31, 1920 – May 11, 2012) was an American football player. He played college football for the Tennessee Volunteers football. In 1941, he led all NCAA major college players with an average of 20.4 yards per punt return. After serving in the U.S. Army Air Corps during World War II, he later played professional football in the National Football League, appearing in 11 games for the Pittsburgh Steelers during the 1947 NFL season.  During his time with the Steelers, he totaled 167 rushing yards and 215 passing yards. He also led the NFL with 435 punt return yards in 1947. In 1948, Slater retired from the NFL and was hired as the backfield coach for the NC State Wolfpack football team. He was the football coach at St. Augustine High School in St. Augustine, Florida from 1950 to 1961.

See also
 List of NCAA major college yearly punt and kickoff return leaders

References

1920 births
2012 deaths
American football halfbacks
Pittsburgh Steelers players
NC State Wolfpack football coaches
Tennessee Volunteers football players
High school football coaches in Florida
Sportspeople from Providence, Rhode Island
Players of American football from Providence, Rhode Island